Emil Viljanen (10 August 1874 - 20 January 1954) was a Finnish civil servant and politician, born in Mouhijärvi. He was a member of the Parliament of Finland from 1913 to 1916 and again from 1919 to 1922, representing the Social Democratic Party of Finland (SDP).

References

1874 births
1954 deaths
People from Sastamala
People from Turku and Pori Province (Grand Duchy of Finland)
Social Democratic Party of Finland politicians
Members of the Parliament of Finland (1913–16)
Members of the Parliament of Finland (1919–22)